The Penn Quakers men's basketball team is the college basketball program representing the University of Pennsylvania. As the twentieth-winningest men's basketball program of all-time, the team from Penn had its greatest success from 1966 to 2007, a period of over 40 years. Penn plays in the Ivy League in NCAA Division I.

On March 20, 1897, Penn and Yale played in the first basketball game with five players on a team. Prior to the formation of the Ivy League in 1956 Penn was a member of the Eastern Intercollegiate League (EIL) from 1903 through 1955. Penn won 13 EIL Regular Season Championships – 1906, 1908, 1916, 1918, 1920, 1921, 1928, 1929, 1934, 1935, 1937, 1945, 1953. Penn was retroactively recognized as the pre-NCAA tournament national champion for the 1919–20 and 1920–21 seasons by the Helms Athletic Foundation and for the 1919–20 season by the Premo-Porretta Power Poll.

Penn has appeared in one Final Four, in 1979.  Penn and Princeton are tied for the most Ivy League regular season championships with 26 each. (1966, 1970, 1971, 1972, 1973, 1974, 1975, 1978, 1979, 1980, 1981, 1982, 1985, 1987, 1993, 1994, 1995, 1996, 1999, 2000, 2002, 2003, 2005, 2006, 2007, 2018). Penn has won 21 outright championships to Princeton's 18 outright championships. Their main Ivy League rivalry is with Princeton, whom they used to always play as the last regular season game. Combining the EIL and Ivy Championships Penn leads with 39 championships; Princeton 32; Columbia 14; Yale 13; Dartmouth 12; Cornell 8; Harvard 6; and Brown 1.

One of Penn's most memorable seasons came in 1979 when the Quakers advanced to the NCAA tournament Final Four. The Quakers faced Earvin "Magic" Johnson and Michigan State in the national semifinals in Salt Lake City, Utah, but ultimately were met with defeat, 101–67. They are the last Ivy League team to advance to the Final Four and Elite Eight of the NCAA Tournament as of 2022. Other notable Penn teams include the team led by guards Matt Maloney and Jerome Allen during the mid-1990s and the nationally ranked teams of the early 1970s led by Dave Wohl, Steve Bilsky, Corky Calhoun and Bob Morse. Penn's 1970–71 team completed an undefeated regular season (26–0) and advanced to the Eastern Regional Final in the NCAA Tournament, losing there to a Villanova team it had defeated during the regular season. Villanova lost to UCLA in the national championship game, but was later found to be using an ineligible player, Howard Porter.

The last NCAA Tournament victory for the Quakers came on March 17, 1994, at the Nassau Veterans Memorial Coliseum in Uniondale, New York.  The No. 11 Red and Blue defeated the No. 6 Nebraska Cornhuskers, 90–80, in the first round.  The Quakers fell in the second round to No. 3 Florida on March 19, 1994, as the Gators prevailed, 70–58.

Rivalries
The Quakers, a member of the Big 5, have long-standing rivalries with a multitude of institutions such as Temple University, La Salle University, Saint Joseph's University, and Villanova University. Another rival is Drexel University, which is a member of the City 6.
In the Ivy League the Penn-Princeton Basketball rivalry is a classic. They have met 239 times since 1903. Penn leads in the series 126 victories to Princeton's 113 victories.

History 
First Year of Basketball: 1897–98
Overall All-Time Record: 1,771–1,092–1
National Championships: 2, (1919–1920) and (1920–1921)
Final Four Appearances: 1 (1979)
Eastern Intercollegiate League Champs: 13
Ivy League Championships: 26
NCAA Tournament Appearances (Last): 24 (2018)
NIT Appearances (Last): 1 (1981)
Last Postseason Opponent: Kansas (NCAA tournament)
Result: Lost 76–60 in the first round. 
PennPrinceton Rivalry: 
Games Penn 126 – Princeton 113//First Met 1903 
Ivy League Championships since 1956 Penn 26–Princeton 26
Outright Ivy League Championships since 1956 Penn 21-Princeton 18
Penn vs. Ivy League Opponents  (Thru 2017–18 season)

Overall Ivy League In-Conference Record: 966-489. 
Total Conference Games Played: 1455 (w/l .663)

Postseason

NCAA tournament results
The Quakers have appeared in the NCAA tournament 24 times. Their combined record is 13–26.

NIT results
The Quakers have appeared in the National Invitation Tournament (NIT) one time. Their record is 0–1.

CBI results
The Quakers have appeared in the College Basketball Invitational (CBI) one time. Their record is 1–1.

Coaches

Player awardsIvy League Men's Basketball Player of the YearA. J. Brodeur (2020)
Zack Rosen (2012)
Ibrahim Jaaber (2006, 2007)
Tim Begley (2005)
Ugonna Onyekwe (2002, 2003)
Ira Bowman (1996)
Matt Maloney (1995)
Jerome Allen (1993, 1994)
Perry Bromwell (1987)
Paul Little (1982)
Tony Price (1979)
Keven McDonald (1978)
Ron Haigler (1975)Ivy League Men's Basketball Rookie of the Year 
Jordan Dingle (2020)*
Tyler Bernardini (2008)
Ugonna Onyekwe (2000)
Will McAllister (1991)
Paul Little (1980)
Keven McDonald (1976)
Ron Haigler (1973)

 General Name of School: University of PennsylvaniaLocation (Zip): Philadelphia, Pa. (19104)Founded: 1740Enrollment: 9,900Nickname: QuakersSchool Colors: Red and BlueArena/Capacity: The Palestra / 8,722Affiliation: NCAA Division IConference: Ivy LeagueOther Affiliation: Big 5President: M. Elizabeth (Liz) MagillAthletic Director: Alana W Shanahan Athletic Department Phone: 215.898.6121Ticket Office Phone: 215.898.6151

 Coaching staff Head Coach: Steve DonahueAssistant Coaches:Nat Graham (Penn '97)
Joe MihalichDirector of Men's Basketball Operations: Regan GallagherAthletic Trainer: Phil “Sam” Samko

 Team information 2018–2019 Overall Record: 19–122018–2019 Ivy League Record/Finish: 7–7/4th2017–2018 Overall Record: 24–82017–2018 Ivy League Record/Finish: 14–2/1st2016–2017 Overall Record: 13–152016–2017 Ivy League Record/Finish: 6–9/4th2015–2016 Overall Record: 11–172015–2016 Ivy League Record/Finish: 5–9/5th2014–2015 Overall Record: 9–192014–2015 Ivy League Record/Finish: 4–10/8th2013–2014 Overall Record: 8–202013–2014 Ivy League Record/Finish: 5–9/6th2012–2013 Overall Record: 9–222012–2013 Ivy League Record/Finish: 6–8/5th2011–2012 Overall Record: 20–132011–2012 Ivy League Record/Finish: 11–3/2nd2010–2011 Overall Record: 13–152011–2012 Ivy League Record/Finish: 7–7/4th2009–2010 Overall Record: 6–222009–2010 Ivy League Record/Finish: 5–9/5th (3 way tie)2008–2009 Overall Record: 10–182008–2009 Ivy League Record/Finish: 6–8/6th2007–2008 Overall Record: 13–182007–2008 Ivy League Record/Finish: 8–6/3rd2006–2007 Ivy League Record/Finish: 13–1/1st2005–2006 Ivy League Record/Finish: 12–2/1stLetterwinners Returning/Lost: 15/0Starters Returning/Lost:''' 5/0

Participations in FIBA competitions
1975 FIBA Intercontinental Cup: 4th place

See also
List of teams with the most victories in NCAA Division I men's college basketball

References

External links